Perth Airport  is a general-aviation airport located at New Scone,  northeast of Perth, Scotland. The airport is used by private and business aircraft, and for pilot training. There are no commercial scheduled flights from the airport.

Perth Aerodrome has a CAA Ordinary Licence (Number P823) that allows flights for the public transport of passengers or for flying instruction as authorised by the licensee, Morris Leslie Limited.

The airport is operated daily from 09:00 to 17:00 by ACS Aviation Ltd.

History

The airport opened in 1936 as Scone Aerodrome. A flight training school, training military pilots, was established shortly after the airport was opened.

Immediately after the start of World War II, researchers working on aircraft-mounted radars were stationed at Scone for a brief period, fitting their radar systems to various aircraft. The site was unsuitable for such work, and the team moved to a new site in Wales in November. During the war, 309 and 666 Squadrons from the Royal Air Force used the aerodrome, then known as RAF (Royal Air Force) Scone.

The only scheduled commercial flights operated briefly from Perth were a British Airways service to Stavanger in Norway at the beginning of the Second World War, and a post-war BEA service to Glasgow's Renfrew airport. The airport was subsequently bought by Airwork Services, which continued the long tradition of pilot training at Perth.

By 1960 Airwork acquired Air Service Training (AST), an engineering training school, which it relocated from the south of England to the airport. The whole operation took on the AST name. AST gained a worldwide reputation for aviation training, being known as Britain's Air University. Students of more than 100 countries have been trained at Perth. Following a worldwide downturn in aviation, AST pulled out of pilot training in 1996. A year later the site was bought by Morris Leslie Ltd.

Perth Airport remains Scotland's main airport for general aviation and is the base of the Scottish Aero Club, which was founded in 1927. The airport is home to flight training organisations providing private and commercial flight training, as well as micro light and autogyro training. Also on site is an aircraft maintenance company, ACS Engineering, and numerous other non-aviation-related businesses.

AST, which is now part of Perth College, retains a presence at the airport and continues to offer aeronautical engineering courses. In 2011, AST announced a returned to airline pilot training.

Scotland's Charity Air Ambulance (SCAA) was formed in 2012 and launched a helicopter air ambulance in May 2013 to assist the Scottish Air Ambulance Service (SAAS) to deliver front-line care to time-critical emergencies across Scotland. SCAA provides a fully equipped medical helicopter that can be deployed from its central base at Perth Airport to incidents across the length and breadth of Scotland.

In February 2019, the airport was reported to be looking into the possibility of attracting low-cost carriers such as Easyjet and Ryanair for scheduled passenger flights, though ACS Aviation subsequently denied having any such plans.

Runways
The airport's runways are:

Due to the airport's terrain, aircraft on the threshold of runway 21 are out of sight to aircraft on runway 09/27.

Lighting
The airport is licensed for night take-offs and landings on runway 03/21. Out-of-hours airport use is strictly Prior Permission Required (PPR).

The lighting is to scale L4 and includes:

Variable Intensity Precision Approach Path Indicator lighting (VI PAPI)
Variable Intensity runway edge (white), threshold (green) and end (red) lighting
Taxiway Bravo exiting towards the start/end of runway 09 has fixed green taxiway centreline lighting
Stopway lighting
Obstacle lighting

There is no approach lighting or aerodrome beacon. Pilot-operated lighting is available for out-of-hours use. Five clicks within five seconds on frequency 119.80 turns on the PAPI lights for ten minutes. An additional five clicks resets the timer to zero. This feature is not available for taxiway lights.

Standard operating procedures
The Aerodrome Traffic Zone (ATZ) is notified active 0900 – 1700z in winter, 0800 – 1600Z in summer, and at other times by NOTAM. Perth Radio (119.80 MHz) is usually manned when the ATZ is active. Its communications are air/ground; it does not give instructions or clearances.

Obstacles
There is a line of hills running northeast–southwest to the east and south of the airport at a distance of 1.5 nm at its closest point. There are two significant peaks – Kingseat, 839 feet Above Aerodrome Elevation (AAL) (1236 feet Above Mean Sea Level (AMSL)), range 5 nm, bearing 058 degrees; and Murrayshall Hill, 521 feet AAL (918 feet AMSL), range , bearing 160 degrees.

There are the following obstacles relative to the following runways:

Runway 15: trees and buildings across climb path, height 15 feet AAL (450 feet AMSL)
Runway 21: trees 164 feet right of climb path, height 53 feet AAL (450 feet AMSL)
Runway 27: trees crossing climb-out path, height 60 feet AAL (457 feet AMSL)

Circuits
The published circuit directions are left-hand for runways 03, 09, 15 and right-hand 21, 27, 33. Circuit height is 1,000 feet AAL.

Reporting points
The standard ATZ reporting points are Perth Racecourse (at Scone), Stanley, Coupar Angus, Newburgh and Bridge of Earn.

Airspace
The airport is in the Scottish Centre (EGPX0839) area control centre.

This procedure is used by Dundee commercial and training traffic irrespective of the runway in use. In an easterly wind, traffic may come as far west as the Perth overhead.

Jet aircraft regularly operate in the vicinity the airport due to its proximity to the former RAF Leuchars,  to the southeast. They can fly as low as 250 feet AAL.

Navigation
The DVOR "PTH" is located immediately to the east of the runway 15 threshold. The waypoint "PTH" is also in the vicinity, part of the UP600 jet airway. It has a magnetic declination of 1.8° west.

References

Citations

Bibliography

Allan, James (2002). Wings Over Scotland. Tervor.

External links 
Perth Airport Official Website
Aerodrome chart – Chartfox
ACS Flight Training
Perth Airport Operator
Scottish Aero Club
Air Service Training
ACS Engineering

Airports in Scotland
Transport in Perth, Scotland
Buildings and structures in Perth, Scotland
Airports established in 1936